The WSO2 Mashup Server is an open-source mashup platform that hosts JavaScript based mashups. It is based on Apache Axis2 and other open source projects, and provides JavaScript authors the ability to consume, compose and emit web services, feeds, scraped web pages, email, and instant messages. The source code is freely available under the open source Apache License. It provides a runtime platform for developing and deploying mashups. It can be downloaded and deployed locally or within an organization.

The WSO2 Mashup Server is web services centric in that each mashup exposes a new web service, which can be consumed by other mashups, web service clients, or Ajax style web pages. The securability of web services make them an attractive technology within organizations deploying a service-oriented architecture (SOA) and for business mashups.

On December 8, 2012, the WSO2 Mashup Server was retired since its remaining functionality, JavaScript web service hosting, was folded into the WSO2 Application Server. WSO2 Application Server went on to eventually become a set of extensions to Apache Tomcat and JavaScript hosting was provided by Jaggery based upon Rhino.

JavaScript as a mashup composition language
Mashups are composed using server side JavaScript in the WSO2 Mashup Server. A set of language extensions along with E4X provides domain specific features such as;
 Calling other SOAP/REST web services,
 RSS/Atom feed reading and writing,
 Web scraping,
 APP based publishing,
 Periodic task scheduling,
 E-mailing and
 IM

A Hello World
function hello() {
    return "Hello World";
}

Calling a SOAP web service
function invokeGetVersionService(){
    var version = new WSRequest();

    var options = new Array();
    options.useSOAP = 1.2;
    options.useWSA = 1.0;
    options.action = "http://services.mashup.wso2.org/version/ServiceInterface/getVersionRequest";

    var payload = null;
    var result;

    try {
        version.open(options,"http://localhost:7762/services/system/version", false);
        version.send(payload);
        result = version.responseE4X;
    } catch (e) {
        system.log(e.toString(),"error");
        return e.toString();
    }
    return result;
}

Working with feeds
// Creating an RSS 2.0 feed and writing it to file.
function createRssFeed() {
    // Creating the Feed
    var feed = new Feed();
    feed.feedType = "rss_2.0";
    feed.title = "This is a test Feed";
    feed.description = "This feed demonstrates the use of Feed host object to create an RSS 2.0 feed.";
    feed.link = "http://mooshup.com/rss20.xml";
 
    // Creating Entries in the Feed
    var entry = new Entry();
    entry.title = "This is a test entry.";
    entry.description = "This is a sample entry demonstrating the use of the Entry host object.";
    feed.insertEntry(entry);
 
    var entry2 = new Entry();
    entry2.title = "This is another test entry.";
    entry2.description = "This is a sample entry demonstrating the use of the Entry host object.";
 
    // Adding a Media Module to the entry
    var mediaModule = new
    MediaModule("http://www.earthshots.org/photos/387.jpg");
    mediaModule.copyright = "2007 Tad Bowman";
    mediaModule.type = "image/jpeg";
    mediaModule.thumbnail = "http://www.earthshots.org/photos/387.thumb.jpg";
    entry2.addMediaModule(mediaModule);
 
    feed.insertEntry(entry2);
 
    // Writing the newly created Feed to a File
    var result = feed.writeTo("test-created-rss-feed.xml");
 
    return result;
}

Web scraping
function webScrape() {
  var config = <config>
                  <var-def name='response'>
                      <html-to-xml>
                          <http method='get' url='http://ww2.wso2.org/~builder/'/>
                      </html-to-xml>
                  </var-def>
               </config>;

  var scraper = new Scraper(config);
  result = scraper.response;

  return result;
}

The syntax is identical to another open source web scraping tool called web harvest.

Working with APP
function persistAuthenticatedAppFeed() {
  // Creating an instance of APPClient
  var client = new APPClient();

  // Creating an instance of AtomFeed
  var feed = new AtomFeed();

  // Setting login credentials for the client
  client.credentials = {username: "you@email.com", password: "xxx", service: "blogger", authtype: "google"};

  // Retrieving and online feed
  feed = client.getFeed("http://blog.mooshup.com/feeds/posts/default");

  // Getting an array of individual entries from the feed
  var entries = new Array();
  entries = feed.getEntries();

  // Writing the retrieved feed to a file
  feed.writeTo("my-file-name.xml");
}

Periodic task scheduling
// Scheduling a function to be executed every 2 seconds
var uuid = system.setInterval('myJavaScriptFunction("parameterValue")', 2000);

// Stopping the above scheduled task
system.clearInterval(uuid);

Sending an e-mail
function sendEmail(){
  var email = new Email("host", "port", "username", "password");
  var file = new File("temp.txt");
  email.from = "test@wso2.com";
  email.to = "test@wso2.com"; // alternatively message.to can be an array of strings. Same goes for cc and bcc
  email.cc = "test@wso2.com";
  email.bcc = "test@wso2.com";
  email.subject = "WSO2 Mashup server 1.0 Released";
  email.addAttachement(file, "temp.txt"); // Optionally can add attachments, it has a variable number of arguments. each argument can be a File hostObject or a string representing a file.
                                          // In this case we are sending two attachments (this demonstrates sending attachments using either a File Host Object or a path to the file).
  email.text = "WSO2 Mashup server 1.0 was Released on 28th January 2008";
  email.send();
}

See also
Mashup (web application hybrid)
ECMAScript for XML
Web scraping
Yahoo! Pipes
Yahoo! query language

References

External links
 

Free software programmed in Java (programming language)
Cross-platform free software
Web scraping